Santa Clarita Cowboy Festival is an annual event held at the William S. Hart Park in Old Town Newhall, Santa Clarita, California. Each year, over 10,000 global visitors attend lectures and performances on multiple stages by famous poets, authors, instructors, musical acts, and dancers in fields including Western, Bluegrass, Americana, Spoken Word, folk, Native American, and Mexican American traditions. Guests participate in cowboy and cowgirl living history through activities such as life around a chuck wagon, roping, bull riding, crafts, games, and trying several dishes, such as BBQ and peach cobbler.

At the festival, guests can also attend a demonstration of plains Tipi living, tours of the historic Heritage Junction town and train engine, appearances by lasso expert Dave Thornbury and gunslinger Joey Rocketshoes Dillon, the Buffalo Soldiers camp, and a Western and Civil War reenactment.

History
The Santa Clarita Cowboy Festival began in 1994 after efforts by city leaders who looked to embrace Santa Clarita’s Western history. The event was first held at Melody Ranch, but due to complications with filming contracts, it had to be relocated to the William S. Hart Park in 2015. In 2018, the festival celebrated its 25th anniversary.

References

Music festivals in Los Angeles
Tourist attractions in Los Angeles
Cowboy culture
Culture of the Western United States
Poetry festivals in the United States